The Ranks of the National People's Army were the military insignia used by the National People's Army, the army of the German Democratic Republic, from 1956 to 1990.

Design

The design of the rank insignias followed the tradition of the German Army with some modifications.

Shoulder strap rank insignias 
Commissioned officer ranks up to  featured four-pointed golden stars in increasing number according to seniority, and arranged following the Soviet pattern.

Junior officer (lieutenant and captain ranks) shoulder straps were made of silver satin string.  had a single golden star,  two side-by-side stars, and  three stars in a triangle.  rank had a fourth star above the triangular formation. 

Senior officer shoulder straps were twisted silver cords,  had a single star,  two stars, and  three stars, again arranged following the Soviet example.

Generals wore twisted golden and silver cords with five-pointed stars numbering from one to four.

Ground forces, Air force, and Border troops 
Remark: The different colours represent the appropriate service, branch, branch of service, or special troop.

General and Officer ranks

Officer candidate or officer aspirant (OA) 
The table below contains the Ofiziersschüler ranks (en: student officers; equivalent to officer candidate or officer aspirant (OA)).

Warrant officers

NCO and enlisted ranks 
<noinclude>

Volksmarine 
While the sleeve ranks of the  officers were of the style used by the Soviet Navy, all shoulder board insignia used were German in origin, with the star arrangement for officers based on the Soviet rank insignia.

Officer ranks and insignia 
Unlike most Warsaw pact navies, the People's Navy also used staff corps insignia on the sleeve following traditional German practice. The sleeve rank insignia shown are those of the line officer corps.

Warrant officers

Petty officers and sailors

Other insignia

Field insignia (1960–1964)
Officers

Enlisted

Aviator and technician suit insignia
Officers

Officer candidate

Warrant officers

Enlisted

See also
 Corps colours (NPA)
 Glossary of German military terms

References

External links
 

German military uniforms
National People's Army